Cleveland Lee Jackson (born October 1, 1956) is a former American football tight end who played one season in the National Football League (NFL) for the New York Giants. He played college football for three different schools before being selected in the 5th round (117th overall) of the 1979 NFL Draft. He also spent time in the NFL with the Philadelphia Eagles and Washington Redskins, in the Canadian Football League (CFL) for the BC Lions, and in the United States Football League (USFL) for the Arizona Wranglers and Oklahoma Outlaws, but did not play.

Early life and education
Jackson was born on October 1, 1956, in Crossett, Arkansas. He attended Northwestern High School in Detroit, Michigan, before starting a college football career with the Michigan State Spartans. After earning a varsity letter in 1975 with Michigan State, he transferred to Los Angeles Southwest College, spending the 1976 season with their team.

He made a second transfer in 1977 to University of Nevada, Las Vegas, often known as UNLV. He finished his education with the school, and played tight end on their varsity team in both seasons with the university.

Professional career
After graduating from UNLV, Jackson was selected in the 5th round (117th overall) of the 1979 NFL Draft by the New York Giants. He made the final roster, and was backup tight end in their first two games. Against the St. Louis Cardinals in week two, he made his first career catch (7 yards) before suffering a season-ending knee injury. He was subsequently placed on injured reserve. He was released by the Giants during the  NFL preseason.

After being released by New York, Jackson was signed by the Philadelphia Eagles, only to be released a day later following a failed physical.

In , Jackson returned to professional football by signing a contract with the BC Lions of the Canadian Football League (CFL). He did not make their final roster.

He did not make their final roster, and was released in February. He made a final comeback attempt the following year with the Oklahoma Outlaws, but was released in training camp.

References

1956 births
Living people
Players of American football from Arkansas
American football tight ends
Michigan State Spartans football players
UNLV Rebels football players
New York Giants players
Philadelphia Eagles players
BC Lions players
Washington Redskins players
Arizona Wranglers players
Oklahoma Outlaws players